Resurrection refers to the coming back to life of the dead.

Resurrection or The Resurrection may also refer to:

Supernatural
 Resurrection of Jesus
 Universal resurrection, often referred to by the term of art "resurrection of the dead", the final resurrection at the end time
 Undead
 Day of Resurrection in Islam, the time when the dead arise from their graves to be judged by God

Arts and entertainment

Film
 Alien Resurrection, a 1997 science-fiction horror film and the fourth installment of the Alien franchise
 Halloween: Resurrection, a 2002 horror sequel of the Halloween franchise
 The Mechanic: Resurrection, a 2016 action film and sequel to the 2011 action film The Mechanic
 Resurrection (1909 film), an American short film by D.W. Griffith
 Résurrection, a 1910 film directed by Henri Desfontaines
 Resurrection (1912 film), a lost silent drama short film directed by Joseph A. Golden
 Resurrezione, a 1917 film by Mario Caserini
 Resurrection (1918 film), an American silent film by Edward Jose
 Resurrection (1923 film), a German silent film by Frederic Zelnik 
 Resurrection (1927 film), an American silent film by Edwin Carewe
 Resurrection (1931 English-language film), an American film by Edwin Carewe
 Resurrection (1931 Italian film), a film by Alessandro Blasetti
 Resurrection (1931 Spanish-language film), an American film by Eduardo Arozamena and David Selman
 Resurrection (1943 film), a Mexican film
 Resurrection (1944 film), an Italian film by Flavio Calzavara
 Resurrection (1958 film), a German/Italian/ French film
 Resurrection (1960 film), a Russian film
 Resurrection, a 1968 British film by David Giles
 Resurrection (1980 film), an American drama directed by Daniel Petrie
 Resurrection (1999 film), a thriller directed by Russell Mulcahy
 Resurrection (2001 film), a drama by Paolo and Vittorio Taviani
 Resurrection, a 2010 film by Jeff Burr
 Resurrection (2016 Argentine film), a film written and directed by Gonzalo Calzada
 Resurrection (2016 Mexican film), a documentary by Eugenio Polgovsky
 Resurrection (2022 film), a psychological thriller directed by Andrew Semans
 Risen (2016 film), originally known as Resurrection
 Tupac: Resurrection, a 2003 documentary

Games
 Mummy: The Resurrection, a role-playing game
 Rise 2: Resurrection, a 1996 PC game

Music
 Resurrection Fest, a Spanish rock music festival

Classical music and operas
 Resurrection (opera), by Peter Maxwell Davies
 Symphony No. 2 (Mahler), by Gustav Mahler, known as the Resurrection Symphony

Albums
 Resurrection (Anastacia album) (2014)
 The Resurrection, a 2021 album by Bugzy Malone
 Resurrection (Chimaira album) (2007)
 Resurrection (Common album) (1994)
 Resurrection (Criminal Nation album) (2000)
 Resurrection (Dungeon album) (1999)
 Resurrection (2005 Dungeon album)
 Resurrection (East 17 album) (1998)
 Resurrection (Galneryus album) (2010)
 The Resurrection (Geto Boys album) (1996)
 Resurrection (Godgory album) (1999)
 Resurrection (Grade 8 album) (2004)
 Resurrection (Halford album) (2000)
 Resurrection (Lords of the Underground album) (1999)
 Resurrection (New Found Glory album) (2014)
 Resurrection (Chris Pérez album) (1999)
 Resurrection (Play Dead album) (1992)
 Resurrection (Possessed album) (2003)
 Resurrection, a 2018 album by Suga Free
 The Resurrection (Theatre of Ice album) (1986)
 Resurrection (Twista album) (1994)
 Resurrection (Venom album) (2000)
 Resurrection (Vice Squad album) (1999)
 Resurrection (Bobby Womack album)  (1994)
 Tupac: Resurrection (soundtrack) (2003)
 Resurrection, by Nicol Sponberg

Songs
 "Resurrection", by Andy Kim, 1968
 "Resurrection", by The McCoys, 1968
 "Resurrection", by Vice Squad, 1981
 "Resurrection", by Status Quo on the album 1+9+8+2, 1982
 "Resurrection", by Terrorizer on the album World Downfall, 1989
 "Resurrection", by Loud, 1990
 "Resurrection" (Brian May song), 1992
 "Resurrection", by Quiet Riot on the album Terrified, 1993
 "Resurrection" (Common song), 1994
 "Resurrection" (Moist song), 1996
 "Resurrection" (Fear Factory EP), 1998
 "Resurrection (Paper, Paper)", by Bone Thugs-n-Harmony, 2000
 "Resurrection", by HIM on the album Razorblade Romance, 2000
 "ResuRection", by PPK, 2001
 "Resurrection", by Nicol Sponberg, 2004
 "The Resurrection" (Lenny Kravitz song), 1996

Other music
 Resurrection (video album), a 2008 live DVD by Flower Travellin' Band

Novels/publications
 Resurrection (Tolstoy novel), an 1899 novel by Leo Tolstoy
 Resurrection (Forgotten Realms novel), a 2005 fantasy novel by Paul S. Kemp and R. A. Salvatore
 Resurrection (magazine), the Journal of the Computer Conservation Society in the UK
 Resurrection, an Oni Press comic
 Projekt Saucer V: Resurrection, a 1999 novel by W. A. Harbinson
 Resurrection, a 2012 novel by Arwen Elys Dayton
 Skulduggery Pleasant: Resurrection, the 10th book in the Skulduggery Pleasant series

Television

Series
 Resurrection (South Korean TV series), 2005 South Korean television series
 Resurrection (American TV series), 2014 U.S. television series
 Resurrection, the title of the third season of Scream

Episodes
 "Reincarnation" (Futurama), originally titled "Resurrection", a 2011 episode of Futurama
 "Resurrection" (CSI: Miami), a 2008 episode of CSI: Miami
 "Resurrection" (Star Trek: Deep Space Nine), a 1997 episode of Star Trek: Deep Space Nine
 "Resurrection" (Stargate SG-1), a 2004 episode of Stargate SG-1
 "Resurrection" (The Flash), a 2022 episode of The Flash
 "Resurrection" (The Outer Limits), a 1996 episode of The Outer Limits
 "Resurrection", a 2013 episode of NCIS: Los Angeles
 "The Resurrection" (War of the Worlds), a 1988 episode of War of the Worlds

Other arts and entertainment
 The Resurrection (Piero della Francesca), a 1460s painting by Piero della Francesca
 The Resurrection (Cecco del Caravaggio), a 1619 painting by Cecco del Caravaggio
 "The Resurrection" ("Il Risorgimento"), an 1828 poem by Giacomo Leopardi also translated "Resurgence"
 The Resurrection (play), a 1927 short play by William Butler Yeats
 Resurrection (Fabergé egg)

Other uses
 Resurrection Health Care, a Catholic health care organization in the Chicago area
 Resurrection Remix OS, Android custom ROM

See also
 Al-Qiyama ("The Resurrection"), the seventy-fifth sura of the Qur'an
 Al-Ba'ath (Arabic for The Resurrection), a Syrian newspaper
 La resurrezione, an oratorio by Georg Frideric Handel
 Risurrezione, a 1904 opera by Franco Alfano
 Resurrección (Verónica Castro album) (2009)
 Resurección (2005), a dance piece created by the alternative tango company CETA
 Resurrected (disambiguation)
 Voskresenie, a quasi-Masonic Russian sect, Russian for Resurrection or Sunday